The lower sulfur oxides are a group of inorganic compounds with the formula SmOn, where 2m > n.  These species are often unstable and thus rarely encountered in everyday life.  They are significant intermediates in the combustion of elemental sulfur.  Some well characterized examples include sulfur monoxide (SO), its dimer S2O2, and a series of cyclic sulfur oxides, SnOx (x = 1, 2), based on cyclic Sn rings.

Interest in the lower sulfur oxides has increased because of the need to understand terrestrial atmospheric sulfur pollution and the finding that the extraterrestrial atmospheres of Io, one of Jupiter's moons, and Venus contain significant amounts of sulfur oxides.
Some compounds reported by early workers such as the blue "sesquioxide", S2O3, formed by dissolving sulfur in liquid SO3 appears to be a mixture of polysulfate salts of the S42+ and S82+ ions.

Sulfur monoxide, disulfur dioxide, disulfur monoxide 
These species are well characterized in the gas phase, but they cannot be isolated as solids or liquids.  Instead, when condensed, they undergo dimerization and oligomerization, usually yielding sulfur dioxide and elemental sulfur.  At a few millibars pressure, the relative stabilities are S2O > S2O2 > SO.  Sulfur monoxide (SO) and its dimer (S2O2) have been trapped at low temperature. Disulfur dioxide (S2O2) is a dimer of sulfur monoxide.  It has C2v structure (planar).

Disulfur monoxide (S2O) is an analogue of sulfur dioxide.  Like SO2 as well as ozone (O3), and trisulfur (S3), it adopts a bent structure. The S-S bond length is 188.4 pm, the S-O bond is 146.5 pm and the SSO angle is 117.88°. The two dipole moment components  are μa = 0.875 D and μb = 1.18 D.  This species decomposes to give a polymeric sulfur oxides ("PSO's") with the approximate formula [S3O]n.  PSO's decompose at room temperature to elemental sulfur and SO2. PSO's have been proposed to be responsible for the colour of Io.

Trisulfur monoxide, S3O is an unstable molecule. It has been detected in the gas phase using neutralization-reionization mass spectrometry. Both cyclic and chain structures were found.

Cyclic SnOx (x = 1, 2)

A number of monoxides SnO are known where n = 5-10. The oxygen atom is exocyclic. They can be prepared  by oxidising the homocycles with trifluoroperoxyacetic acid: 
Sn  +  CF3C(O)OOH  →   SnO  +  CF3C(O)OH
The compounds are yellow or orange-coloured and thermally unstable near room temperature.

One dioxide is well characterized: the deep orange S7O2 (m.p. 60–62 °C with decomposition), which arises using trifluoroperoxoacetic acid.

References

Sulfur oxides
Interchalcogens